P'yŏngnam Taean station is a railway station located in Ŭndŏk-tong, Taean-guyŏk, Namp'o-t'ŭkpyŏlsi, North Korea, on the Taean Line of the Korean State Railway.

History
The station was originally opened by the Chosen Government Railway.

References

Railway stations in North Korea